"Harvest for the World" is a 1976 single released by American musical group The Isley Brothers on their T-Neck imprint. It was the title track from their 1976 album Harvest for the World.

Background and composition
One of their socially conscious singles (about world peace), the song was composed by Ernie Isley, who wrote most of the lyrics, together with Marvin Isley and Chris Jasper, with additional lyrics and musical arrangements added by the three original members O'Kelly, Rudolph and Ronald. The song was recorded on the same day as Fight the Power (Part 1 & 2) and was originally intended to go on The Heat Is On (album) as the lead single but Fight The Power ended up being the lead single by a group vote and was saved to go on the harvest for the world LP, and as on many Isley Brothers records, Ronald sang lead on the song while his older brothers O'Kelly and Rudolph usually backed him up.

Chart performance
The song became a top ten R&B hit, peaking at No. 9, and peaking at No. 63 on the Billboard Hot 100. It was a bigger hit in the UK, reaching No. 10 on the UK Singles Chart.

Cover versions
British/American supergroup the Power Station recorded a cover of it for their 1985 self-titled debut album.

The Christians released a 1988 hit cover of the song that reached No. 8 in the UK.

Paul Carrack released a 2001 cover of the song in his album "Groovin'".

Vanessa Williams covered the song for her 2005 album Everlasting Love.

Personnel
 Ronald Isley: lead vocals, background vocals
 O'Kelly Isley Jr.: background vocals
 Rudolph Isley: background vocals
Ernie Isley: electric guitar, acoustic guitars, drums, background vocals
Marvin Isley: bass guitar, background vocals 
Chris Jasper: piano, keyboards, synthesizers, background vocals 
Handclaps by The Isley Brothers
Produced, written, arranged and composed by The Isley Brothers and Chris Jasper

References

1976 singles
1988 singles
Anti-war songs
Peace songs
The Isley Brothers songs
Songs written by Chris Jasper
T-Neck Records singles
Charity singles
Songs written by Ernie Isley
Songs written by Marvin Isley
Songs written by Rudolph Isley
Songs written by O'Kelly Isley Jr.
Songs written by Ronald Isley
1976 songs